Oppidum Novum is the name of several ancient towns:

 Oppidum Novum (Aquitania), city in Aquitaine, France
 Oppidum Novum (Caesariensis), city in Mauretania Caesariensis, now in Algeria
 City in Mauretania Tingitana, today Ksar el-Kebir in Morocco

Archaeological sites in Morocco
Archaeological sites in Algeria
Catholic titular sees in Africa
Former Roman Catholic dioceses in Africa
Roman towns and cities in Mauretania Tingitana
Roman towns and cities in Mauretania Caesariensis